Arthur Briton Menzies (13 May 1892 – 31 October 1960), also known by the nickname of "Joe", was a New Zealand professional rugby league footballer who played in the 1920s. He played at representative level for New Zealand (Heritage No. 187), and Waikato, and at club level for the Ngaruawahia Panthers,

International honours
Menzies represented New Zealand in 1926 against Wales.

References

1892 births
1960 deaths
New Zealand national rugby league team players
New Zealand rugby league players
People from Norfolk Island
Rugby league props
Waikato rugby league team players
Ngaruawahia Panthers players